Ian Postman (born 27 September 1982) is a South African cricketer. He played one first-class and two List A matches between 2003 and 2004. He was also part of South Africa's squad for the 2002 Under-19 Cricket World Cup.

References

External links
 

1982 births
Living people
South African cricketers
Eastern Province cricketers
Place of birth missing (living people)